Napoleone Colajanni (Castrogiovanni, 27 April 1847 – Castrogiovanni, 2 September 1921) was an Italian writer, journalist, criminologist, socialist and politician. In the 1880s he abandoned republicanism for socialism, and became Italy's leading theoretical writer on the issue for a time. He has been called the father of Sicilian socialism. Due to the Socialist party's discourse of Marxist class struggle, he reverted in 1894 to his original republicanism. Colajanni was an ardent critic of the Lombrosian school in criminology. In 1890 he was elected in the national Italian Chamber of Deputies and was re-elected in all subsequent parliaments until his death in September 1921.

Redshirt
Colajanni was born in Castrogiovanni (now Enna) in Sicily in a family of intense patriotic feelings. His father Luigi Colajanni and mother Concetta Falautano were small entrepreneurs in the sulfur industry.

At a young age he was inspired by Giuseppe Garibaldi and attempted to join the Redshirts in the Expedition of the Thousand for the unification of Italy in 1860 escaping to Palermo at the age of 13, but without success. A relative recognised the young boy and brought him back home. Two years later, in 1862, when Garibaldi passed by Castrogiovanni in his Expedition against Rome, Colajanni joined the troops. He reached the Aspromonte, where he was captured by government troops and deported to the island of Palmaria. Liberated after an amnesty he returned to Sicily but volunteered again with Garibaldi's troops in the Third Italian War of Independence in 1866 and participated in the Battle of Bezzecca in Trentino, northern Italy, in July 1866.

After the war, he finished school and started to study medicine in Genoa. He  made contact with the Republicans of Giuseppe Mazzini and started to write for Il Dovere (The Duty). In 1867 he returned to Castrogiovanni due to the death of his father, but immediately left to join Garibaldi again in his new campaign to capture Rome. He arrived too late when the Battle of Mentana – in which Garibaldi was defeated by Papal troops and a French auxiliary force – had already ended.

He took up his study in medicine again, this time in Naples. On February 26, 1869, he was arrested for taking part in a Republican conspiracy. He remained in prison until November 17, when an amnesty was declared because of the birth of the future king of Italy, Victor Emmanuel III of Italy.

Towards positivist and evolutionary socialism
After graduating in Medicine in 1871, he enrolled as a physician on a ship to South America before returning to Italy to devote himself to the study of sociology and continue his political activities. He returned to his home town, Castrogiovanni, where he practiced medicine and managed some sulfur mines owned by his mother.

In 1875, Colajanni was among the participants at the Republican Congress in Rome to revive the movement. He started to collaborate with the magazine La rivista repubblicana of Arcangelo Ghisleri, which put him in contact with the exponents of republicanism and socialism in Milan. Through these democratic groups Colajanni came into contact with the positivist theories, and personalities such as Filippo Turati and Leonida Bissolati. Colajanni became one of the protagonists of the Italian positivist and evolutionary socialism, inspired by Darwinian evolution.

With his book Il socialismo, published in 1884 in Catania, he became one of the first theoreticians of the Italian workers movement. His socialism was not based on the scientific Marxist approach, but was closer to the ideology of Mazzini – one of the fathers of Italian unification – with some influence of French utopian thinkers such as Georges Sorel, and in terms of practical politics resulted in a kind of radical-democratic reformism.

In 1892 he was appointed Professor of Statistics at the University of Palermo. Since 1896 he directed the Rivista popolare, by means of which he strove to improve the moral and intellectual standard of the masses and combated all forms of intolerance and hypocrisy.

Criminal sociology

He published many books and essays on social and political problems, and exposed the unscientific theories of Cesare Lombroso and his Scuola positiva (Positive school) and Enrico Ferri on criminology. Colajanni was particularly critical of Lombroso's biological determinism – in particular the alleged inferiority of southern Italians – and he put a much greater emphasis on social conditions as a cause of offending. Lombroso and his disciples, however, remained dominant in Italy.

Colajanni was the first to publish a book with criminal sociology in the title. He belonged to the Terza scuola (Third School) and argued that in order to curtail the level of crime in a society there should be a certain level of security with regard to sustainable living conditions, economic stability and a more equal welfare distribution.

After the publication of his two-volume study La sociologia criminale in 1889, in which he emphasized the social factors on criminal behaviour, he was virulently attacked by Lombroso and his disciples. The work received a moderately positive response from the scientific community both in Italy and abroad. Lombroso, however, did not allow any criticism by rival scientists and his alleged scientific supremacy. He unleashed a smear campaign and scientific crusade against Colajanni while blocking access to academic journals to prevent Colajanni's replies.

In his essay Per la razza maledetta (For the cursed race, published in 1898) Colajanni ridiculed the anthropometrical categories of the Lombrosian school and deconstructed their cultural stereotypes. He argued that the high rates of criminality in Southern Italy – the so-called evidence of Southern racial inferiority – could simply be explained by social conditions and levels of education. He opposed the notion of racial superiority as an ideological tool to legitimise dominance and exploitation, which would lead to the destruction of other races instead of its alleged progressive transformation. In a later work, Latini e anglo-sassoni: Razze superiori e razze inferiori (Latins and Anglo-Saxons. Inferior and superior races, published in 1903), he expanded his critique on the concept of superior and inferior civilisations to the Anglo-Saxon nations.

Political activities
In 1879 Colajanni had been appointed as a municipal councillor in Castrogiovanni. In 1882 he was a candidate in the general election in the constituency of Caltanissetta, and while not elected he obtained a significant following. Although poor health forced him to stay at Castrogiovanni, he continued to write political articles in periodicals of democratic orientation.

In 1890 he was elected in the national Italian Chamber of Deputies in the district of Caltanissetta for the first time. He was re-elected in all subsequent parliaments until his death in September 1921. In Parliament he sat as a Republican and showed socialist tendencies, becoming one of the de facto leaders of the Republicans in Parliament. He sponsored initiatives such as the parliamentary inquiry on colonial adventure in Eritrea (1891) and the Banca Romana scandal (1892).

He argued against the incipient colonial policy of the moderate Left. Anti-colonialism was one of his favourite themes. In his book Politica coloniale (Colonial policy), written in 1891, Colajanni rejected the colonial adventure in Eritrea. According to Colajanni, the poor agricultural conditions made the country inappropriate for impoverished southern Italian populace and completely inadequate to serve as a market for the emerging Italian industry.

Colajanni played an important role in the Banca Romana scandal. A suppressed report about the sorry financial state of the bank was leaked to Colajanni, who divulged its contents to parliament. On December 20, 1892, Colajanni read out long extracts in Parliament and Prime Minister Giovanni Giolitti was forced to appoint an expert commission to investigate the bank. The resulting inquiry caused the fall of the government of Giolitti in November 1893.

Fasci Siciliani
Though never a member of the Socialist Party, Colajanni was Sicily's leading political radical. He supported the Fasci Siciliani a popular movement of democratic and socialist inspiration, which arose in Sicily in the years between 1891 and 1893. The demands of the movement were fair land rents, higher wages, lower local taxes and distribution of misappropriated common land. He took the Fasci under his political protection, defending them in parliament and in the press.

Francesco Crispi, who took over after the fall of Giolitti in December 1893, promised important measures of land reform for the near future. Crispi was not blind to the misery and the need for social reform. Before 1891 he had been the patron of the Sicilian working-class and many of their associations had been named after him. Crispi's good intentions were soon drowned in the clamour for strong measures. In the three weeks of uncertainty before the government was formed, the rapid spread of violence drove many local authorities to disregard Giolitti's ban on the use of firearms. In December 1893 many peasants lost their lives in clashes with the police and army.

In order to stem the turmoil, Crispi offered Colajanni the Ministry of Agriculture, which he refused. When riots on the island got out of hand, Crispi asked Colajanni to undertake a mission of appeasement on Sicily. On January 3, 1894, only four days after Crispi had promised Colajanni there would be no state of siege, martial law was declared in the island. General Roberto Morra di Lavriano was dispatched with 40,000 troops to restore order. Colajanni condemned the Fasci leaders for lacking to keep the peace. After conferring with general Morra he issued a manifesto in which he urged the people to restore order. He argued that the government was engaged in bettering the working conditions and deserved their confidence, at least for a while. People breaking the peace he called fools and traitors.

Within a few days of the declaration of martial law and the violent suppression of the Fasci, Colajanni broke with Crispi and wrote the book Gli avvenimenti di Sicilia e le loro cause on the events in Sicily, which put the main blame on Crispi. The disorders were not the product of a revolutionary plot, but Crispi chose to believe otherwise. On the basis of dubious documents and reports, Crispi claimed that there was an organised conspiracy to separate Sicily from Italy; the leaders of the Fasci conspired with the clerics and were financed by French gold, and war and invasion were looming.

Disillusioned by the spread of violence in Sicily, to which he believed the Socialist party's discourse of class struggle had contributed, Colajanni reverted in 1894 to his original republicanism. On April 12, 1895, he took part in the founding congress of the Italian Republican Party (Partito Repubblicano Italiano).

Against the Mafia
A recurring theme of his political engagement was the struggle to overcome the economic contrast between North and South of Italy, through a reform of society, but also of the state through federalism. His contribution the socio-political definition of the Southern question was substantial, in particular with the volumes Settentrionali e meridionali (Northern and southern, published in 1898) and Nel regno della mafia (In the realm of the Mafia, published in 1900).

Colajanni identified the root of the backwardness of Sicily in power groups of landowners of  the rural estates and the Mafia, which were closely connected to each other and in a close relationship with public administration on the island. This connection was well established had become normal practice from 1876 onwards. The only hope to change the situation lay in an autonomist-federalist reform of the state.

In 1900, Colajanni wrote a j’accuse directed at the magistracy, the police, and the government in relation to the trial about the 1893 murder of Emanuele Notarbartolo, the ex-mayor of Palermo and ex-governor of the Bank of Sicily. Notarbartolo had been killed on the instruction of Raffaele Palizzolo, a member of parliament and a director of the Bank of Sicily, in revenge for exposing a swindle using the bank's money. Palizzolo was allegedly involved with the Sicilian Mafia.

The Italian government, Colajanni wrote, has done everything to consolidate the Mafia and render it omnipotent. “To fight and destroy the reign of the Mafia, it is necessary that the Italian government ceases to be the king of the Mafia,” he said in his book Nel regno della mafia. The government, he said, needed to clean up Sicily and institute a fair and practical administration.

Anti-Marxism
Colajanni continued to reject the ideological underpinnings of classical Marxism, which he considered to be a contradiction to democracy. He remained a social-Darwinist throughout his life, convinced that socialism would be a product of a natural process of evolution and social selection.

He did not consider himself a materialist: the social question was not only an economic issue but also an ethical one. He rejected the concept of class struggle. He did not deny that there was a struggle, but he saw it as the first stage of evolution, which was not be encouraged, but passed in favour of a greater spread of altruism. A position that proved irreconcilable with Marxism, which led him to adhere to the newborn Republican Party. He also opposed revolutionary syndicalism and severely criticized the general strike of 1904.

He opposed the Italian invasion of Libya in 1912, but at the outbreak of the First World War, despite his anti-militarist ideas, he became an ardent supporter of the interventionist camp on the side of the Triple Entente. He launched a vigorous campaign against Avanti, the organ of the Italian Socialist Party (PSI), when Benito Mussolini was removed as chief editor, and openly criticized the PSI for what he considered Bolshevik sympathies.

He strongly opposed the communists that had left the socialist party in January 1921, and felt certain sympathy for fascism in its initial phase. Like many other intellectuals and politicians of all persuasions, he saw fascism as an extreme defence against the dangers of Bolshevism, but condemned its recourse to violence. In August 1921 he applauded the agreement between socialists and fascists to put an end to the civil war. His death on 2 September 1921, saved him from, with the benefit of hindsight, an embarrassing adhesion of fascism.

Main books
 Il socialismo e sociologia criminale. (Catania: Tropea, 1884)
 La sociologia criminale. (Catania: Tropea, 1889)
 Gli avvenimenti di Sicilia e le loro cause. (Palermo: Remo Sandron, 1895)
 Settentrionali e meridionali: Agli Italiani del Mezzogiorno (Milano/Palermo/Roma: Sandron/Rivista popolare, 1898)
 Nel regno della mafia, dai Borboni ai Sabaudi . (Palermo: Remo Sandron, 1900)
 Latini e anglo-sassoni: Razze superiori e razze inferiori. (Roma: Rivista Popolare, 1903)

References

 Colajanni, Napoleone & Marcello Donativi (1900/2009). Nel regno della mafia, Brindisi: Edizioni Trabant, 
 Emsley, Clive (2007). Crime, police, and penal policy: European experiences 1750-1940, Oxford University Press, 
 Fentress, James (2000). Rebels & Mafiosi: Death in a Sicilian Landscape, New York: Cornell University Press, 
 Gregor, Anthony James (1979). Young Mussolini and the intellectual origins of fascism, Berkeley: University of California Press, 
 Hiller, Jonathan R. (2009). "Bodies that Tell": Physiognomy, Criminology, Race and Gender in Late Nineteenth- and Early Twentieth-century Italian Literature and Opera, dissertation at the University of California
 Hurwitz, Stephan & Karl O. Christiansen (1983). Criminology, George Allen & Unwin, 
  Huysseune, Michel (2006). Modernity and Secession: The Social Sciences and the Political Discourse of the Lega Nord in Italy, New York/Oxford: Berghahn Books, 
 Seton-Watson, Christopher (1967). Italy from liberalism to fascism, 1870-1925,  New York: Taylor & Francis, 1967 
 Van Swaaningen, René (1997). Critical Criminology: Visions from Europe, London: SAGE Publications,

External links
 
 

1847 births
1921 deaths
People from Enna
Kingdom of the Two Sicilies people
Politicians of Sicily
Historical Far Left politicians
Italian Republican Party politicians
Deputies of Legislature XVII of the Kingdom of Italy
Deputies of Legislature XVIII of the Kingdom of Italy
Deputies of Legislature XIX of the Kingdom of Italy
Deputies of Legislature XX of the Kingdom of Italy
Deputies of Legislature XXI of the Kingdom of Italy
Deputies of Legislature XXII of the Kingdom of Italy
Deputies of Legislature XXIII of the Kingdom of Italy
Deputies of Legislature XXIV of the Kingdom of Italy
Deputies of Legislature XXV of the Kingdom of Italy
Deputies of Legislature XXVI of the Kingdom of Italy
Italian socialists
Italian criminologists
Fasci Siciliani
Antimafia
Academic staff of the University of Palermo